Darral Willis Jr. (born January 21, 1996) is an American basketball player for Seoul Samsung Thunders of the Korean Basketball League. Born and raised in Madison, Wisconsin, Willis played high school basketball at Madison Memorial High School]. After two years at Pearl River and two years at Wichita State Willis entered the 2018 NBA draft but was not selected in the draft's two rounds.

High school career
Willis played high school basketball at Madison Memorial, in Madison, Wisconsin.

College career
Willis started his college career with Pearl River Community College. After dominating the JUCO ranks in his 2015–16 season following high school, Willis garnered offers from  programs which included Wichita State, Arizona State, LSU, Oklahoma State, and Marquette, among others. He left the college in order to join Wichita State until 2018.

Professional career
After going undrafted in the 2018 NBA draft, Willis joined Keravnos of the Cypriot League. He won the Cypriot Cup and he was named the MVP of the game after scoring 40 points and grabbing 17 rebounds in the final against AEK Larnaca. For the 2020-2021 season Willis joined AS Monaco.

On July 17, 2020, he signed with As Monaco of the LNB Pro A. In the middle of the season in France, Willis moved to Italy signing with Brescia.

On September 9, 2021, he has signed with BC Enisey of the VTB United League.

On August 19, 2022, he signed with Lokomotiv Kuban of the VTB United League.

On January 15, 2023, he signed with Seoul Samsung Thunders of the Korean Basketball League.

References

External links
College stats @ realgm.com
Keravnos B.C. profile

1996 births
Living people
21st-century African-American sportspeople
African-American basketball players
American expatriate basketball people in Cyprus
American expatriate basketball people in France
American expatriate basketball people in Ukraine
AS Monaco Basket players
American men's basketball players
Basket Brescia Leonessa players
Basketball players from Wisconsin
BC Nizhny Novgorod players
Junior college men's basketball players in the United States
Keravnos B.C. players
PBC Lokomotiv-Kuban players
Pearl River Community College alumni
Power forwards (basketball)
Wichita State Shockers men's basketball players